Spodnje Hlapje is a settlement in the Slovene Hills in the Municipality of Pesnica in northeastern Slovenia. The area is part of the traditional region of Styria. The municipality is now included in the Drava Statistical Region.

A small chapel in the settlement dates to 1914.

References

External links
Spodnje Hlapje on Geopedia

Populated places in the Municipality of Pesnica